Mads S. Jessen (born 14 October 1989) is a Danish professional football attacking midfielder, who last played for Hobro IK.

References

External links
 
 Career statistics at Danmarks Radio

1989 births
Living people
Danish men's footballers
SønderjyskE Fodbold players
Danish Superliga players
Association football midfielders
Association football forwards
Hobro IK players